The 1944 Wisconsin Badgers football team was an American football team that represented the University of Wisconsin in the 1944 Big Ten Conference football season. The team compiled a 3–6 record (2–4 against conference opponents) and finished in seventh place in the Big Ten Conference. Harry Stuhldreher was in his ninth year as Wisconsin's head coach. This was the first season since 1905 that the Badgers started the season away from home.

On November 11, 1944, Allan Shafer, a 17-year-old freshman quarterback, died at Wisconsin General Hospital from a hemorrhage to the lung after a hit sustained in the second half of Wisconsin's 26-7 victory over Iowa. His jersey number (No. 83) was retired, and his name appears on the Camp Randall Stadium facade.

Tackle Clarence Esser received the team's most valuable player award. Shafer was the team captain. Jug Girard, a 17-year-old freshman, was selected by Look magazine as a first-team halfback on the 1944 College Football All-America Team.

The team played its home games at Camp Randall Stadium. During the 1944 season, the average attendance at home games was 22,010.

Schedule

See also
 List of American football players who died during their career#College

References

Wisconsin
Wisconsin Badgers football seasons
Wisconsin Badgers football